Rajendra Ramoon Maharaj is an Indo-Afro-Caribbean artist, stage director, playwright and activist. He is represented by Michael Moore Agency Literary & Creatives. This season at Opera Theatre of St. Louis, Maharaj will direct Scott Joplin’s Treemonisha, re-imagined by composer Damien Sneed and librettist Karen Chilton. He is also the stage director and community consultant for Slanted: An American Rock Opera by Simon Tam and Joe X. Jang, Madison Lodge by Tre’von Griffith, and Cook Shack by Del’Shawn Taylor and Samiya Bashir as part of Opera Theatre of St. Louis’ Inaugural New Works Collective. Last season, he was assistant director for the world premiere of Fire Shut Up in My Bones at the Metropolitan Opera, and he is a current member of the Met/AGMA Equity & Diversity Committee. Maharaj has previously served as the Associate Artistic Producer at Milwaukee Repertory Theater, Artistic Director of New Freedom Theatre, Producing Artistic Director of American Stage, and Third-Vice President of the National Association for the Advancement of Colored People Brooklyn Branch. Maharaj has worked on Broadway, off-Broadway and regionally. His credits include the Bernard B. Jacobs Theater, Madison Square Garden, Sheen Center, The Public, Second Stage, SoHo Playhouse, Classical Theater of Harlem, New Federal Theater, New World Stages, Ensemble Studio Theatre, Portland Stage, Actors Theater of Louisville, Alabama Shakespeare, Signature Theater, Theater Works, Goodman Theatre, Arkansas Repertory Theater, Perseverance, and The Kennedy Center. His numerous honors include the Woodie King Jr. Award, four AUDELCO Awards, Barrymore Award, Stage Directors and Choreographers Society Theatrical Moment of the Year, The New York International Fringe Festival Overall Excellence Award, Theater Communications Group Directors Grant and Playwriting Grant, National Alliance for Musical Theater Award, and Trinidad and Tobago United Community Award for his outstanding contribution to the Trinidad and Tobago Diaspora as an Artist and Arts Advocate.

Education
Maharaj holds an associate degree in Criminal Justice from St. John's University, a Bachelor of Arts in Communication Arts from St. John's University, and a Master of Fine Arts in Theatrical Directing from Brooklyn College.

Career

Opera 
In 2021, Maharaj served as Assistant Director of the World Premiere of the Grammy winning opera Fire Shut Up In My Bones (Terence Blanchard / Libretto by Kasi Lemmons) at the Metropolitan Opera. This production was notable as the first time an opera by an African American composer appeared on the main stage.

Maharaj is the stage director of the World Premiere of The Factotum at the Lyric Opera of Chicago in their 22-23 season. He is also the Co-Book Writer and Dramaturg for this new American opera.

Maharaj will be the stage director and a consultant of the Opera Theatre of St. Louis 2023 New Works Collective

Theater 
Maharaj started Rebel Theater Company in 2003 in New York City, and served as Producing Artistic Director. He has previously served as Producing Artistic Director and Resident Playwright of American Stage Theatre Company in St. Petersburg, FL, as Associate Artistic Producer of Milwaukee Repertory Theater, and as Artistic Director of New Freedom Theatre in Philadelphia.

As a director, Maharaj has worked on Broadway, Off-Broadway and at some of the nation's top regional theaters. New York City selected directing/choreography credits include: The Public Theatre (365 Days, Memphis Minnie workshop), Classical Theatre of Harlem (Marat Sade), Lark Play Development Center (Man Measures Man, Breathe), Woodie King Jr.'s New Federal Theatre (Diss Diss and Diss Dat), Rebel Theater (Mother Emanuel - 2016 NY Fringe Festival, Othello: The Panther, Salome: Da Voodoo Princess of Nawlins, Black Footnotes, Trail of Tears, R+J: An Uncivil Tale - Choreographer), Making Books Sing (Band of Angels, Shelter in my Car, Chachajis Cup), Amas Musical Theatre (Bubbling Brown Sugar, Damn Yankees, Mamma I Want to Sing, Magpie).

His regional directing credits include: American Stage (Jacob Marley's Christmas Carol, School Girls; Or, The African Mean Girls Play), Milwaukee Repertory Theater, New Freedom Theatre (Mother Emanuel, An America Musical Play The Ballad of Trayvon Martin, Jamaica, Don't Bother Me, I Can't Cope (Barrymore Recommended), The Black Nativity and Walk Through Time, by Pulitzer Prize Recipient - Lynn Nottage - World Premiere), Passage Theatre (Little Rock - 2015 Barrymore Award - Outstanding Ensemble in a Play).

Maharaj has received awards for his body of work in the American Theater, including the Woodie King Jr. Award, four Vivian Robinson AUDELCO Awards, Barrymore Award, Stage Directors and Choreographers Society Theatrical Moment of the Year, The New York International Fringe Festival Overall Excellence Award, Theater Communications Group Directors Grant and Playwriting Grant, Recipient of the 2020 National Alliance for Musical Theater Fifteen-Minute Musical Theater Challenge Award.

He received grants for the Van Lier Directing Fellowship, Brooklyn Arts Council Grant, Winthrop Rockefeller Grant, Doris Duke Charitable Grant, Andrew W. Mellon Grant and Time Warner Diverse Voices Grant. Maharaj is the recipient of the 2021 Negro Ensemble Company Cutting Edge Playhouse Playwriting Residency. He is an alumnus of Lincoln Center Directors Lab, TCG Young Leaders of Color in the American Theater, and New Orleans Writers Residency 2020. He was the 2020 Letter of Marque Playwright in Residence, a member of Theater Now’s 2021 Virtual Musical Theater Writer’s Group and the inaugural playwright for the Theatre Raleigh New Works Reading Series.

Playwright 
As a playwright, Maharaj has authored several plays, including Little Rock, a historical drama about the Little Rock Nine. Maharaj spent thirteen years interviewing members of The Little Rock Nine, the first nine African American teenagers who integrated Little Rock Central High School. The play had its developmental premiere at Arkansas Repertory Theatre. It received another developmental production as part of the 2011 New Works Festival at TheatreWorks in Palo Alto, California. It went on to receive a production in 2014 at Passage Theatre in Trenton, NJ where it won the 2015 Barrymore Award for Outstanding Ensemble in a Play. In 2018 it made its New York Off-Broadway premiere at The Sheen Center for Thought & Culture.

Activism  

Maharaj is a member of the Met AGMA Diversity-Equity-Inclusion Committee and alumnus of the Arts Equity BIPOC Leadership Circle in association with the David Geffen Yale School of Drama. From 2018 - 2020, he served as the Third Vice-President for the National Association for the Advancement of Colored People for the Borough of Brooklyn, as well as the founding Chairman for the Equity in the Arts and Culture Committee of the National Association for the Advancement of Colored People for the Borough of Brooklyn. Maharaj has been recognized with the Time Warner Diverse Voices Grant, New York City Council Citation for Outstanding Community Service Leadership, New York State Senate Citation for Outstanding Community Service and Mentoring Leadership, The Commonwealth of Pennsylvania House of Representatives Citation for Excellence in the Performing Arts, Philadelphia Mayoral Proclamation from Hon. Michael Anthony Nutter, and a Proclamation from New York City Mayor, Eric L. Adams. Maharaj was  awarded the 2020 Trinidad and Tobago United Community Association Inc. Award for his outstanding contribution to the Trinidad and Tobago Diaspora as an Artist, Advocate, and Educator in the United States of America.

References

External links

Living people
Brooklyn College alumni
1972 births